William Cumin was a 12th-century bishop of Durham.

William Cumin is also the name of:

 William Cumin (obstetrician) (died 1854), medical academic

See also
 William Comyn (disambiguation)